Emor: Rome Upside Down is the only EP by Les Savy Fav, released in 2000. It was released by Southern Records.

It marks a turning point in the band's sound, partially due to the departure of former guitarist Gibb Slife. Synths and more angular line-driven guitar work expand on the already established punk from their two previous albums, 3/5 and The Cat and the Cobra.

Reception

The online music magazine Pitchfork placed Emor: Rome Upside Down at number 164 on their list of top 200 albums of the 2000s.

Track listing
 "I.C. Timer" – 2:40 
 "Asleepers Union" – 5:12
 "In These Woods" – 3:02
 "Hide Me from Next February" – 2:51
 "Rome" – 4:00

Personnel 
Tim Harrington - vocals
Harrison Haynes – drums
Seth Jabour – guitar
Syd Butler - bass
Nicolas Vernhes – engineer

Notes

2000 EPs
Les Savy Fav albums